Ega is a genus of ground beetles in the family Carabidae. There are about 17 described species in Ega.

Species
These 17 species belong to the genus Ega:

 Ega aequatoria Chaudoir, 1850 c g
 Ega amazonica Chaudoir, 1872 c g
 Ega anthicoides (Solier, 1836) c g
 Ega argentina (Brèthes, 1916) c g
 Ega biloba Bates, 1871 c g
 Ega brasiliensis Motschulsky, 1864 c g
 Ega delicatula (Motschulsky, 1864) c g
 Ega formicaria Laporte, 1834 c g
 Ega fuscoaenea Motschulsky, 1864 c g
 Ega laetula LeConte, 1851 c g
 Ega longiceps (Schaum, 1863) c g
 Ega montevidensis (Tremoleras, 1917) c g
 Ega nodicollis Bates, 1871 c g
 Ega obliqua Chaudoir, 1872 c g
 Ega sallei Chevrolet c g b
 Ega sulcipennis Chaudoir, 1872 c g
 Ega tenuicollis (Dejean, 1831) c g

Data sources: i = ITIS, c = Catalogue of Life, g = GBIF, b = Bugguide.net

References

Further reading

External links

 

Harpalinae
Carabidae genera